Ratchaburi  Football Club (Thai: สโมสรฟุตบอลจังหวัดราชบุรี) is a Thai professional football club based in Ratchaburi province that currently plays in Thai League 1. Ratchaburi has the nickname The Dragons which can be seen in the club official crest.

History

Establishment and early years
Ratchaburi Football Club was founded in 2004 and then joined Thailand Division 2 League 2006. Ratchaburi able to win the Thailand Division 2 League title, get the right to compete in the 2007 Thailand League Division 1.

The League Division 1 season 2007 has a total of 24 teams participating in the competition, divided into 2 groups, 12 teams each and at the end of the competition, the top five of each group will be relegated to the competition. Thai League Division 2, the club did not perform very well, finished the season with the last place in the group A table.

In 2008, Ratchaburi Football Club made the seventh place out of the 11 participating teams, causing the team to relegate, but due to the Football Association of Thailand reshaping the competition in the season 2009 makes Ratchaburi continue to compete in the Thai League Division 2

2009 Regional League Division 2 is the first season to compete in a 5-region zone system, Ratchaburi Football Club is organized in the Central and Eastern region. The club finished the season with 9th place out of 12 participating teams.

Dragon's breath
In 2010, the Nitikarnchana family decided to take over Ratchaburi Football Club, which was then in the Regional League Division 2. In 2011 they won the Central-East Division before earning promotion to Division 1 after winning Group A of the Division 2 playoffs.

Prior to the 2012 season, Ratchaburi Football Club was sponsored by the Mitr Phol Group and announced the change of the club's name to Ratchaburi Mitr Phol FC, with Sorraaut Klinprathum as the club's president, Boonying Nitikarnchana as the club's vice president and Thanawat Nitikarnchana is the team manager and Somchai Maiwilai is a head coach.

Whilst in Division 1, Ratchaburi made it to the 2012 Thai League Cup final where they lost 4–1 to Buriram United. The final was most remembered for the farcical circumstances that Ratchaburi faced as they didn't have any substitutes on the bench due to having several ineligible loanees from opponents Buriram United.  Ratchaburi never stood a chance as Buriram won the final at a canter.

Promotion to the top flight
In the following season, the Dragons flew through the first division winning the title on their way to the TPL.

In the first season of the Ratchaburi Mitr Phol in top-tier league is considered unsuccessful, ranked 15th out of the total of 18 teams, but due to the problem of scrambling for the rights of the team between Sisaket F.C. and Esan United escalate, The Thai League company decided to increase the top 20 teams in TPL, resulting in the Thai Premier League competition in 2013 season, there was only one relegation team, Pattaya United (17th place).

In 2014 season, Ratchaburi Mitr Phol reacted by appointing former Girona manager Ricardo Rodríguez as their new manager for the new 2014 Thai Premier League season. The Dragons finished comfortably in 4th place.

Move to Mitr Phol Stadium and recent years

After participating in the top league for 3 years, Ratchaburi Mitr Phol has a project to build its own football stadium. The stadium started construction in 2015 and opened for the first time in mid-2016. In 2016 the club moved to new ground, Mitr Phol Stadium and the club appointed Robert Procureur as the club technical director.

In 2016, Following the death of King Bhumibol Adulyadej, the Football Association of Thailand cancelled the remaining league and cup season on 14 October 2016, with three rounds remaining. The Dragons finished in 6th place.

In 2017 The Dragons continued to progress under Pacheta's stewardship, and with a team containing half blood players Philip Roller and Kevin Deeromram reached league finish as 6th place as well as reaching the semi-final of the League Cup losing 0–1 to Chiangrai United at  Supachalasai Stadium.

In 2018 Thai League, a dismal run of form saw the team slip to the bottom of the league table. The Dragons finished the season in 12th place with 43 points, they were one point adrift from safety.

In 2019, after beating Buriram United in the semi-final, The Dragons reached the FA Cup Final for the first time in their history. In the final, played at Leo Stadium, Ratchaburi Mitr Phol lost to Port 0–1, with a goal by Sergio Suárez scored in second half. Ratchaburi made it becoming the runner-up of the competition. In 2020, Ratchaburi qualified to AFC Champions League for the first time in club history after get the position of top four in the table.

Academy
Ratchaburi Mitr Phol opened its first youth academies in 2016 under the name The Dragons Academy.  In 2017, Ratchaburi Mitr Phol have appointed Douglas Cardozo as Head of Youth Development.

Stadium
From 2007 to 2016 the club was used Ratchaburi Provincial Stadium that own by the city council as their home ground that causes problems with difficult and incomplete applications. So that, In June 2016 the club was built Mitr Phol Stadium that located in the town of Huai Phai, Ratchaburi Province to be new home ground and it directly own by the club and the stadium held 10,000 seats.

Stadium and locations

Season-by-season record

Continental record

Players

First-team squad

Out on loan

Club officials

Currently Coaching staff

Manager History

  Somchai Maiwilai 
  Prapol Pongpanich 
  Somchai Maiwilai 
  Iván Palanco 
  Ricardo Rodríguez 
  Àlex Gómez 
  Josep Ferré 
  Pacheta 
  Christian Ziege 
  René Desaeyere 
  Lassaad Chabbi 
  Manolo Márquez 
  Francesc Bosch 
  Marco Simone 
  Somchai Maiwilai  (caretaker)
  Nuengrutai Srathongvian 
  Chaitud Uamtham 
  Somchai Maiwilai  (caretaker) 
  Miloš Joksić 
  Seksan Siripong 
  Somchai Maiwilai 
  Bruno Pereira 
  Xavi Moro

Honours

League

 Thai Division 1 League:
Winner:  2012
 Regional League Division 2:
Winner:  2011
 Regional League Central-East Division:
Winner:  2011

Cups

 League Cup:
Runners-up: 2012, 2013
FA Cup
Champions: 2016
Runners-up: 2019

References

External links
 Official Facebook

 
Thai League 1 clubs
Association football clubs established in 2004
Football clubs in Thailand
Sport in Ratchaburi province
2004 establishments in Thailand